Rashid Latif Medical Complex (abbreviated as RLMC), established in 2010 and named after its founder Rashid Latif Khan, is a private medical college located at Ferozepur Road, Lahore, Punjab, Pakistan. It occupies 28 acres on Ferozepur Road,  and was established by graduate and post-graduate medical professors. Rashid Latif Nursing College was established in 2011 and was affiliated with Pakistan Nursing Council. Rashid Latif College of Physiotherapy was started in 2013 with in an affiliation with the University of Health and Sciences (UHS). In 2014, through an affiliation with the University of Sargodha, Rashid Latif College of Pharmacy was established, drawing 50 students per year. In 2018, Rashid Latif Dental College was established and was affiliated with UHS.

Courses

Teaching Hospital

RLMC is attached with a teaching hospital, the Arif Memorial Teaching Hospital, established and inaugurated in November 2010, with a capacity of 610 patient beds . As a charitable institute, it is funded predominantly from donations. Apart from fulfilling the requirements of the medical college, Arif Memorial Teaching Hospital has gynecology, pediatric, surgery, orthopedic, medical and ICU treatment facilities and round the clock emergency services. In addition, the hospital provides neonatal intensive care and 24/7 nurseries.

Academic Council

Admission Policy
(For MBBS) The college admits 150 students on open merit for the MBBS program. Admission is gender agnostic, and is granted through a centralized Medical College Admission Test (MCAT) conducted by the University of Health Sciences Lahore annually. International students can also apply for admission through the Higher Education Commission of Pakistan. The candidates that meet minimum academic requirements are short listed for an Interview to test aptitude, communication skills, and English language skills.

Board of Governors

Research
Laboratory for Translational Oncology and Personalised Medicine (LTOPM) is part of the Rashid Latif Medical College. The goal of the LTOPM is to focus on personalised medicine by creating preventative health care for individuals based on their genetics, and medical and family history.

References

Medical colleges in Punjab, Pakistan
Universities and colleges in Lahore
2010 establishments in Pakistan
Educational institutions established in 2010